Debbie Dingle (also Jones and Barton) is a fictional character from the British ITV soap opera Emmerdale, played by Charley Webb. Webb has taken maternity leave three times, with the first time being in 2010 and the second throughout 2016 with Debbie departing on 1 January 2016. She returned on 24 January 2017 and then went on maternity leave for a third time in 2019 as Debbie left for Scotland on 13 August 2019. She returned for a short stint on 25 December 2020 and made her final appearance on 11 February 2021.

She was introduced as the foster child of Paddy Kirk (Dominic Brunt) and Emily Kirk (Kate McGregor) before being revealed as the daughter of Charity Dingle (Emma Atkins) and Cain Dingle (Jeff Hordley). She has featured in many storylines on Emmerdale including  her relationships with Andy Sugden (Kelvin Fletcher), which lead to her pregnancy at 15, Jasmine Thomas (Jenna-Louise Coleman) and Scott Windsor (Ben Freeman), her daughter Sarah being diagnosed with a blood disorder, her disastrous relationship with Cameron Murray (Carl King's, Gennie Walker's and Alex Moss's real killer) (Dominic Power), which sparked the 2013 week of episodes known as "The Woolpack Siege,"; a relationship with Pete (Anthony Quinlan), who she later marries and her affair with Ross (Michael Parr), a relationship with Tom Waterhouse later revealed as Joe Tate (Ned Porteous) and being conned by him but later forgiving him and getting back together, accidentally having Ross as the victim of an acid attack, learning Sarah suffers from heart failure and needs a transplant, and dealing with the false revelation that Cain killed Joe (although it was later revealed that he is alive).

Development

Characterisation

Webb told Gemma Graham from TV Buzz that the reason she "loves" playing Debbie is that she has always been a fighter. "Nothing will knock her down and if it does she'll get back up again". Webb said that she would not pick a fight with Debbie because she would win "any day".

In one storyline Debbie takes part in a jewellery heist with the help of  Chastity Dingle (Lucy Pargeter) and Lexi Nicholls (Sally Oliver). Lexi is given a bracelet at a sale and pretends she has stolen it to impress Debbie. Oliver told Kris Green of Digital Spy that Debbie thinks that stealing jewellery must be easy. Debbie thinks of a "big master plan" and they attend a party at Home Farm. The three females "dress up-the-nines" in "camp costumes". Debbie gets Chas and Lexi to cause a diversion while she steals an expensive necklace. Oliver said that over the following episodes viewers found out what really happened with the necklace and what they plan to do with it. Debbie's attitude causes Lexi to become suspicious; Oliver said that Lexi "wants the necklace straight back, it's not the sort of thing she's going to take lightly." Debbie starts plotting to sell the necklace and keep the proceeds for herself. Oliver said Debbie swaps the necklace for a fake and makes Chas and Lexi think she has lost it. The production team did not use real diamonds in the storyline and opted for plastic glass. Oliver said that she did not think they would get away with the scam.

Temporary departure
In June 2015, Webb announced she was pregnant with her second child and took her maternity leave later that year. Debbie departed on 1 January 2016 and it was confirmed in December 2016 that Webb will make her return in January 2017. Her return scenes aired on 24 January 2017.

Maternity leave and departure (2019, 2021)
In 2019, it was announced that Webb would be taking maternity leave for a third time; her return scenes aired in December 2020. Her exit scenes aired in February 2021; Webb's husband Wolfenden has stated that she would only reprise her role once the COVID-19 pandemic protocols in place on the soap were retired, but confirmed that she had no plans to return. Later that year, Wolfenden was accused of mimicking the accent of a mixed race actress on set. An investigation into the accusations was launched and Webb was reported to have sided with Wolfenden. Webb subsequently made the decision to leave Emmerdale permanently.

Reception
For her portrayal of Debbie, Webb won the "Best Young Actor" award at the 2005 Inside Soap Awards. In 2007, Webb was nominated for "Best Actress" at the British Soap Awards and the Inside Soap Awards. On Digital Spy's 2012 end of year reader poll, Chas and Cameron's affair and the subsequent effect on Debbie was voted fourth in the "Best Storyline" category, receiving 8.9% of the vote. Webb told Gemma Graham from TV Buzz that the reason she "loves" playing Debbie is the fact she has always been a fighter. "Nothing will knock her down and if it does she'll get back up again". Webb said that she would not pick a fight with Debbie because she would win "any day". Webb was nominated for the Best Actress award and the Villain of the Year award at The British Soap Awards 2013, and has been nominated for the Best Actress award again in 2014.

Kris Green of Digital Spy said that he thought the jewellery heist storyline was inspired by the 2000 Millennium Diamond heist. A writer from Holy Soap said "this tough cookie has had an eventful life, despite her tender years" and named Debbie's most "memorable moment" as being imprisoned for Shane's murder. In 2011, Gemma Graham of TV Buzz said that Webb had spent ten years in British living rooms playing Debbie. They said she is a character that has received numerous blows because she is a Dingle – but always came back fighting. If anyone needed a character from Emmerdale to fight their battles, Graham said that Debbie would be their choice. Of her attitude Graham added, "There's barely a soul in the soap's village who hasn't received a tongue-lashing from our Debs at one time or other. Quite honestly, she even puts the fear of God into us." Sarah Ellis of Inside Soap said that Debbie was not happy with Cameron nor Andy, "judging by the amount of time she spends looking miserable." Roz Laws of the Sunday Mercury branded Debbie as an "ice queen".

See also
 List of Emmerdale characters (2002)
 List of LGBT characters in soap operas
 List of soap opera villains

References

External links
 Debbie Dingle at itv.com
 Debbie Dingle at What's on TV
 Debbie Dingle at Holy Soap

Emmerdale characters
Television characters introduced in 2002
Female characters in television
Adoptee characters in television
Fictional offspring of incestuous relationships
Female villains
Fictional bisexual females
Fictional characters involved in incest
Fictional female businesspeople
Fictional kidnappers
Fictional mechanics
LGBT villains
Fictional criminals in soap operas
Fictional taxi drivers
Fictional teenage parents
Teenage pregnancy in television
Fictional LGBT characters in television
Fictional prisoners and detainees
Teenage characters in television